Congregation Shomrei Emunah is an Orthodox Jewish synagogue in the Greenspring neighborhood of Baltimore, Maryland. Rabbi Binyamin Marwick is the synagogue's rabbi.

History
The synagogue was founded in 1971 by Lithuanian-born Rabbi Benjamin Bak, who led the congregation from 1972 until 1989. Bak was succeeded by Rabbi Tzvi Hersh Weinreb, who served as spiritual leader for 13 years before becoming head of the Orthodox Union in 2002. Under Weinreb's administration, membership increased from 140 to 450 families.

Rabbi Dovid Gottlieb, who received his rabbinic ordination from Rabbi Isaac Elchanan Theological Seminary, served as spiritual leader until making aliyah in 2009. 
He was succeeded by Rabbi Binyamin Marwick, a musmach of Yeshivas Ner Yisroel, rabbi since 2009. The Shul has grown under his leadership to over 700 families.
  
The congregation's present building, completed in 2009, was designed by Curry Architects of Towson, Maryland. Jerusalem stone is incorporated in the interior wall design of the central lobby and gallery. The  edifice includes a 500-seat sanctuary, lecture rooms, and a bridal suite. In 2009 the synagogue began offering a $10,500 wedding package for nuptials held on site, saving congregants an estimated 50 to 70 percent off the cost of local wedding halls. The package includes the facility and catering, but does not include the band or photographer. Celebrants are able to obtain some items, such as bridal dresses and table settings, from local gemachs.

Membership
The synagogue's large and active membership encompasses a broad spectrum of American Orthodox Jewry, including Hasidic, non-Hasidic, Modern Orthodox, centrist, and Haredi. The congregation is openly supportive of its host country and was one of the first synagogues in the United States to add a prayer for the US armed services to its Shabbat morning prayers following 9/11. Like other Orthodox congregations in the city, synagogue members engage in charitable activities for non-Jewish as well as Jewish causes.

The congregation has paired with the Israeli settlement of Eli as its sister city.

Activities
The synagogue schedules many shiurim (Torah lectures) and adult education opportunities, including guest lecturers, regular shiurim in Daf Yomi, Amud Yomi, Chumash, Navi, and Halakha. The youth program includes all ages from two to post high school.  The synagogue has weekly Shabbat youth groups and a popular teen minyan with a weekly kiddush.

The Congregation is a center for many major city events, including Rabbi Frand's annual teshuva drasha, musical concerts and important lectures. In January 2014 the Diaspora Yeshiva Band staged one of its first three reunion concerts at Shomrei Emunah; band founder and lead singer Avraham Rosenblum is a synagogue member.

Bibliography

References

External links
 Congregation Shomrei Emunah official website
 Shomrei Youth website

Ashkenazi Jewish culture in Baltimore
Ashkenazi synagogues
Cheswolde, Baltimore
Lithuanian-American culture in Baltimore
Lithuanian-Jewish culture in Maryland
Orthodox Judaism in Baltimore
Orthodox synagogues in Maryland
Synagogues in Baltimore
1971 establishments in Maryland